Squads for the 1972 AFC Asian Cup played in Thailand.

Iran

Head coach: Parviz Dehdari

Reza Vatankhah

Iraq

Head coach: Abdelilah Mohammed Hassan

Khmer Republic

Head coach:

Kuwait

Head coach:  Ljubiša Broćić

South Korea

Head coach: Park Byung-seok

Thailand

Head coach:  Günther Glomb

References

External links
https://web.archive.org/web/20140102232311/http://rdfc.com.ne.kr/int/skor-intres-1970.html

AFC Asian Cup squads